Dhatav is a  Village in Roha Taluka  in Raigad district  in the state of Maharashtra, India. Dhatav connected through Mumbai & Pune through Mumbai Goa Highway in kolad

Demographics
 India census, Dhatau had a population of 5035. Males constitute 56% of the population and females 44%. Dhatau has an average literacy rate of 72%, higher than the national average of 59.5%: male literacy is 78% and, female literacy is 65%. In Dhatau, 14% of the population is under 6 years of age.

References

Cities and towns in Raigad district